is a Japanese footballer currently playing as a defender for Kyoto Sanga.

Career statistics

Club
.

Notes

References

2004 births
Living people
Association football people from Shiga Prefecture
Japanese footballers
Japan youth international footballers
Association football defenders
Kyoto Sanga FC players